KJCW, VHF analog channel 7, was a television station licensed to Sheridan, Wyoming, United States. The station was owned by Western Family Television. Its license was canceled and call sign deleted on December 23, 2010.

History
The station signed on in April 2002 as KBNM under the ownership of Sunbelt Communications Company. The station displaced K07HC, a translator for CBS affiliate KTVQ (channel 2) in Billings, Montana, to channel 9 as K09XK; in its earliest months, KBNM served as a temporary satellite of KTVQ, but with plans to become an NBC affiliate. After joining NBC, the station, which was renamed KSWY on November 1, 2002, served as a pass-through for NBC programming, with virtually no local content (including commercials); this ended on September 1, 2003, at which point it became a satellite of sister station KCWY (channel 13) in Casper, Wyoming (which joined NBC that same day).

In 2008, Sunbelt exchanged KSWY to Western Family Television in exchange for KJCW-LP (channel 29), which had previously been listed as a JCTV affiliate.  When the sale closed on May 9, 2009, KSWY went silent due to the loss of its tower site; its programming then moved to channel 29, renamed KSWY-LP.  The KSWY callsign remained on channel 7 as well until May 4, 2010, when it took the KJCW callsign abandoned by KSWY-LP a year prior.  The station proposed to return to the air (with the JCTV programming previously seen on KJCW-LP/KSWY-LP) from a temporary site as it continued to seek a permanent transmitter location.  On December 23, 2010, the FCC canceled its license and deleted the KJCW call sign; its records indicated that the station did not return to the air within a year of May 9, 2009, triggering the automatic expiration of the KJCW license.

As an affiliate of KTVQ, the station's transmitter was co-located with KPRQ 88.1 FM just off Red Grade Road southwest of Sheridan. KTVQ now operates a translator on channel 9 (K09XK-D) from the same site.

References

JCW
Television channels and stations established in 2002
Television channels and stations disestablished in 2009
Defunct television stations in the United States
2002 establishments in Wyoming
2009 disestablishments in Wyoming
Sheridan, Wyoming
JCW